Prabhat Mukherjee (1917-1997) was an Indian film director, actor and writer. He is known for his work in Bengali, Assamese, Oriya and Hindi language films.

Career
Mukherjee's career began with All India Radio. He started acting in Bengali films in 1950. The first film directed by him was Maa (1956) in Bengali language. Mukherjee directed three more films till 1960. Assamese film Puberun, directed by Mukerjee was released in 1959. The film was screened at the 1960 Berlin Film Festival. He also wrote the script for the film. From 1972 to 1984, Mukherjee made at least five Oriya films. One of these is Ratnakar (1982), which was the first film of Odia actor and director Prashant Nanda.  In 1972 Mukherjee directed his first Hindi-language film  Shayar-e-Kashmir Mahjoor, which was a biopic on Ghulam Ahmad (1885-1952), the famous national poet of Kashmir and produced by Government of Jammu and Kashmir. Balraj Sahni played the title role. After that Mukherjee directed two more Hindi films before coming back to Bengali films. He introduced Mallika Sarabhai into films.

Personal life
Mukherjee married to Arundhati Devi (Guha Thakurta), who was an actress in Bengali film. She acted in Mukherjee’s directorial debut Maa.  Mukherjee had also co-starred with Arundhati in Bengali film Shorashi  (1954) directed by Pashupati Chetrjee.  However his married life did not last. Arundhati met director Tapan Sinha at the Barlin Film Film Festival in 1957 and later Arundhati Devi and Sinha got married.

His second marriage also failed. Though he was a successful person in his career, Mukherjee was emotionally plagued by two divorces until he visited Dwarka Mai and the home of Shirdi Sai Baba’s tomb. Here he found peace, courage and strength to turn his life around and live it to the fullest. He spent the remainder of his life studying the teachings of Shirdi Sai Baba, the Indian saint.

References

External links
 

Bengali film directors
Hindi-language film directors
Assamese-language film directors
Odia film directors
1917 births
1997 deaths